Garry Marsh (21 June 1902 – 6 March 1981) was an English stage and film actor.

Born Leslie Marsh Gerahty in St Margarets, Surrey, his parents were George and Laura. His elder brothers were the author Digby George Gerahty and the journalist Cecil Gerahty. 

Marsh began acting on the stage at the age of fifteen. He started off in films as a leading man but later became a character actor playing self-important roles.

During the War he served as a Flying Officer in the RAF. In the mid-1950s, he chronicled his wartime adventures in North Africa in the memoir Sand in My Spinach.

Marsh married Adele Lawson in 1920 in Kensington, London. He married for the second time to Muriel Martin-Harvey in 1926 in Chelsea, London before divorcing in 1935.

Selected filmography

 Long Odds (1922) – Pat Malone
 Night Birds (1930) – Archibald Bunny
 The Professional Guest (1931, Short) – Seton Fanshawe
 Uneasy Virtue (1931) – Arthur Tolhurst
 Third Time Lucky (1931) – Capt. Adrian Crowther
 The Eternal Feminine (1931) – Arthur Williams
 Dreyfus (1931) – Maj. Esterhazy
 The Man They Couldn't Arrest (1931) – Delbury
 Stranglehold (1931) – Bruce
 Dr. Josser, K.C. (1931) – Carson
 Keepers of Youth (1931) – Knox
 Postal Orders (1932, Short)
 The Star Reporter (1932, Short) – Mandel
 Stamboul (1932) – Prince Cernuwitz
 After Office Hours (1932) – Brewer
 Number Seventeen (1932) – Sheldrake
 COD (1932) – Peter Craven
 Fires of Fate (1932) – Captain Archer
 The Maid of the Mountains (1932) – Beppo
 Don't Be a Dummy (1932) – Captain Fitzgerald
 Taxi to Paradise (1933, Short) – George Melhuish
 Forging Ahead (1933) – Honorable Horace Slimminger
 The Lost Chord (1933) – Joseph Mendel
 Falling for You (1933) – Archduke Karl
 That's a Good Girl (1933) – Francis Moray
 The Silver Spoon (1933) – Hon. Roland Stone
 Two Wives for Henry (1933) – Henry Stetson
 The Love Nest (1933) – Hugo
 Ask Beccles (1933) – Eustace Beccles
 Rolling in Money (1934) – Dursingham
 It's a Cop (1934) – James Risden
 Warn London (1934) – Van Der Meer
 Gay Love (1934) – Freddie Milton
 Money Mad (1934) – Rutherford
 The Green Pack (1934) – Tubby Storman
 Josser on the Farm (1934) – Granby
 Widow's Might (1935) – Barry Carrington
 Three Witnesses (1935) – Charles Rowton
 Inside the Room (1935) – Geoffrey Luce
 Mr. What's-His-Name? (1935) – Yates
 Full Circle (1935) – Max Reeves
 Department Store (1935) – Timothy Bradbury
 Night Mail (1935) – Capt. Ronnie Evans
 Death on the Set (1935) – Inspector Burford
 Scrooge (1935) – Belle's Husband
 Charing Cross Road (1935) – Berry
 A Wife or Two (1936) – George Hamilton
 When Knights Were Bold (1936) – Brian Ballymoat
 Debt of Honour (1936) – Bill
 The Amazing Quest of Ernest Bliss (1936) – The Buyer
 The Man in the Mirror (1936) – Tarkington
 All In (1936) – Lilleywhite
 The Vicar of Bray (1937) – Sir Richard Melross
 The Angelus (1937) – Fen Markham
 Intimate Relations (1937) – George Gommery
 Melody and Romance (1937) – Warwick Mortimer
 Leave It to Me (1937) – Sergeant
 It's a Grand Old World (1937) – Stage Manager
 A Romance in Flanders (1937) – Rodd Berry
 Bank Holiday (1938) – 'Follies' Manager
 The Dark Stairway (1938) – Dr. Mortimer
 I See Ice (1938) – Tim Galloway
 The Claydon Treasure Mystery (1938) – Sir George Ilford
 Break the News (1938) – The Producer
 Convict 99 (1938) – Johnson
 It's in the Air (1938) – Commanding Officer Hill
 This Man Is News (1938) – Sergeant Bright
 The Ringer (1938, TV Movie) – Central Det. Insp. Bliss
 Let's Be Famous (1939) – Walton
 Trouble Brewing (1939) – A.G. Brady
 The Four Just Men (1939) – Reporter
 This Man in Paris (1939) – Sergeant Bright
 Old Mother Riley Joins Up (1940) – Dr. Leach
 Return to Yesterday (1940) – Charlie Miller
 Hoots Mon! (1940) – Charlie Thompson
 Let George Do It! (1940) – Mark Mendez
 I'll Be Your Sweetheart (1945) – Wallace
 Dead of Night (1945) – Harry Parker (segment "The Ventriloquist's Dummy")
 Pink String and Sealing Wax (1945) – Joe Bond
 The Rake's Progress (1945) – Sir Hubert Parks
 I See a Dark Stranger (1946) – Capt. Goodhusband
 A Girl in a Million (1946) – General
 While the Sun Shines (1947) – Mr. Jordan
 The Shop at Sly Corner (1947) – Major Elliot
 Frieda (1947) – Beckwith
 Dancing with Crime (1947) – Det. Sgt. Murray
 Just William's Luck (1948) – Mr. Brown
 Daybreak (1948) – Barbershop Customer (uncredited)
 Good-Time Girl (1948) – Mr. Hawkins
 My Brother's Keeper (1948) – Brewster
 Things Happen at Night (1948) – Spenser
 William Comes to Town (1948) – Mr. Brown
 Forbidden (1949) – Jerry Burns
 Badger's Green (1949) – Major Forrester
 Murder at the Windmill (1949) – Detective Inspector
 Paper Orchid (1949) – Johnson
 Miss Pilgrim's Progress (1949) – Mayor
 Someone at the Door (1950) – Kapel
 Something in the City (1950) – Mr. Holley
 Old Mother Riley's Jungle Treasure (1950) – Jim
 Worm's Eye View (1951) – Pop Brownlow
 The Magic Box (1951) – 2nd Company Promoter
 Madame Louise (1951) – Mr. Trout
 The Lost Hours (1952) – Inspector Foster
 The Voice of Merrill (1952) – Inspector Thornton
 Those People Next Door (1953) – Sir Andrew Stevens
 Double Exposure (1954) – Beaumont
 Aunt Clara (1954) – Arthur Cole
 Man of the Moment (1955) – British Delegate
 Johnny, You're Wanted (1956) – Balsamo
 Who Done It? (1956) – Hancock
 Trouble with Eve (1960) – Roland Axbridge
 Upgreen – And at 'Em (1960)
 Ring of Spies (1964) – 1st Member at Lord's (uncredited)
 Where the Bullets Fly (1966) – Major
 Ouch! (1967, Short) – Father
 Arthur! Arthur! (1969) – Golfer

References

External links
 

1902 births
1981 deaths
Male actors from London
20th-century English male actors
English male film actors
Actors from Twickenham
Royal Air Force personnel of World War II
Royal Air Force officers